= T. T. Sherman =

American football player

Career information
- College: Yale (1872–1873)

Awards and highlights
- National championship (1872)

Thomas T. Sherman was an early college football player for the Yale Bulldogs, scoring the first points in the team's history. He graduated in 1874.
